Holland Public Schools is a school district in Holland, Michigan, United States, founded in 1848.  There are 314 teachers, with an average of 14 years experience each, most possessing master's degrees. They offer instruction in core curriculum along with other programs, including art, music, athletics, theater, forensics, K-12 Spanish, technology literacy, special education, English as a Second Language, and extra-curricular activities.

Schools
Holland Heights School (TK-5)
Holland Jefferson School (TK-5)
Holland West School (TK-5)
Holland Language Academy (K-5 Two-Way Bilingual Immersion)
Holland Middle School (6-8)
VR Tech School (8-12)
Holland High School (9-12)

Notable alumni
 Hopwood DePree - owner of Tic Toc Studios

References

External links

School districts in Michigan
Holland, Michigan
School districts established in 1848
Education in Ottawa County, Michigan
Education in Allegan County, Michigan
1848 establishments in Michigan